The Robert E. Lee Hotel in St. Louis, Missouri, also known as Auditorium Hotel, Evangeline Home, or Railton Residence, is a Romanesque style building.  It was listed on the National Register of Historic Places in 2007.

It was designed in 1927 by architect Alonzo H. Gentry and was built during 1927–28.  It is a 14-story building with a cast concrete structural framework and red brick walls.

It was originally opened as the Robert E. Hotel.  Purchased by the Salvation Army in 1939 for $1.

Later, as Evangeline Booth Home, it provided housing for wives separated from their husbands in active duty in the military during World War II.

Named the "Railton Residence" in the 1970s and provided low-income housing.

Closed in 2008 for renovations.

Its renovation was completed in 2010 and since then it has served as a Salvation Army residence.

References

Hotels in St. Louis
Commercial buildings on the National Register of Historic Places in Missouri
National Register of Historic Places in St. Louis
Hotels in Missouri
Downtown West, St. Louis